Aznayevo (Aźnay) is a rural locality (selo) in Dyomsky Selsoviet, Bizhbulyaksky District, Bashkortostan, Russia. The population was 411 as of 2010. There are 6 streets.

Geography 
Aznayevo is located 30 km south of Bizhbulyak (the district's administrative centre) by road. Dyomsky is the nearest rural locality.

References 

Rural localities in Bizhbulyaksky District